Sauce Viejo is a city in the province of Santa Fe, Argentina. It is located about 22 km from the province's capital city, Santa Fe, and has a population of 8,123 inhabitants which represents a growth of 87.96% compared to the 3,631 inhabitants of the previous census.

The town of was founded on December 12, 1912 by Provincial law.

Sauce Viejo Airport (ICAO:SAAV)
 It is located 17 km SW of Santa Fe, Argentina

Populated places in Santa Fe Province
Cities in Argentina
Argentina
Santa Fe Province